The 470 European Championships are international sailing regattas in the 470 class.

Editions

Medalists

Open

Men and Mixed

Men

Women

Mixed

References

 
470 competitions
European championships in sailing
Recurring sporting events established in 1966